"Another You, Another Me" is the debut solo song recorded by American country music artist Brady Seals. It was released in September 1996 as the first single from the album The Truth. The song reached No. 32 on the Billboard Hot Country Singles & Tracks chart.  The song was written by Seals' uncle, Troy Seals, along with Will Jennings.

Content
The song is a country pop ballad, described by Wendy Newcomer of Cash Box magazine as having a sound similar to England Dan & John Ford Coley. It features a harmony vocal from Wynonna.

Music video
The music video was directed by Gary Wenner, and premiered in late 1996.

Chart performance

References

1996 debut singles
1996 songs
Brady Seals songs
Songs written by Troy Seals
Songs with lyrics by Will Jennings
Song recordings produced by Rodney Crowell
Reprise Records singles